Antarctodomus is a genus of sea snails, marine gastropod mollusks in the family Buccinidae, the true whelks.

Species
Species within the genus Antarctodomus include:

 Antarctodomus okutanii Numanami, 1996
 Antarctodomus thielei (Powell, 1958)

References

Buccinidae